Ship of Fools: How a Selfish Ruling Class Is Bringing America to the Brink of Revolution is a nonfiction political book by Fox News host, Tucker Carlson. Published by Simon & Schuster, Ship of Fools was released on October 2, 2018, before that year's midterm elections, and entered number one on The New York Times Best Seller list.

Synopsis
Carlson's thesis applies the allegory given in Plato's Republic to the modern United States: the American Ship of State has been commandeered by an incompetent crew (the current political and economic elite ruling class) who are oblivious or contemptuous to the needs of the passengers (the citizens) and intolerant of criticism. Carlson does not restrict his definition of the elite to liberal members of Congress, but includes both Republican (Mitch McConnell, Lindsey Graham) and Democrat (Maxine Waters, Nancy Pelosi, and Hillary Clinton)  politicians, neoconservative pundits such as Bill Kristol, and entrepreneurs such as Mark Zuckerberg and Jeff Bezos, whom he blames for decimating the American middle class. Quickly summarizing the premise of the book, Carlson has said it simply amounts to: "Why did Trump get elected?"

Reception
The Washington Times praised the book, describing it as "bulging with big and interesting ideas, presented succinctly with wit and precision, each chapter a potential book in itself. In a sense, it reflects how and why Mr. Carlson’s television show is so highly successful—quick intelligence, precision with words, the rat-a-tat style that today’s television demands." President Donald Trump, who Carlson describes as "vulgar and ignorant" and "a throbbing middle finger in the face of America's ruling class" in the book, publicly congratulated Carlson for the book's success.

Marianna Raymond, Carlson's liberal first-grade teacher at La Jolla Country Day School, of whom Carlson writes loudly crying at her desk and his wish for her to "stop blubbering and teach us to read," was interviewed by The Washington Post in 2021 about her inclusion in the book. Raymond, who said Carlson was "very precious and very, very polite and sweet" when she knew him, called her inclusion "the most embellished, crazy thing" she had ever heard. She claimed she never cried at her desk, never advocated her political views openly, and had actually been hired to tutor Carlson, where he claimed a separate tutor had to be hired.

References

2018 non-fiction books
American political books
Books critical of modern liberalism in the United States
Books about the 2016 United States presidential election
English-language books
Simon & Schuster books
Books by Tucker Carlson